Noble Township is the name of seven townships in the U.S. state of Indiana:

 Noble Township, Cass County, Indiana
 Noble Township, Jay County, Indiana
 Noble Township, LaPorte County, Indiana
 Noble Township, Noble County, Indiana
 Noble Township, Rush County, Indiana
 Noble Township, Shelby County, Indiana
 Noble Township, Wabash County, Indiana

Indiana township disambiguation pages